Maacher Jhol - The fish curry is a 2D animated movie. The movie is about a son's LGBTQ issue coming out to his father, while he prepares his favourite dish - which is the Maacher Jhol (A traditional fish recipe in Bengal, India). The movie is directed by Abhishek Verma.

Awards 
 City of Annecy Award 2017
 Best Indian Narrative Short Film Award at Kashish Film festival
 National Award for Best Animation in 2018 India

References 

2017 animated films
2017 films
Gay-related films
Indian animated short films